Louis-Anne La Virotte  (15 July 1725, in Nolay (Côte-d’Or) – 3 March 1759, in Paris) was an 18th-century French physician and encyclopédiste.

Biography 
He first studied  medicine at the Université de Montpellier. He then moved to the French capital and was introduced to the Journal des sçavans through the protection of chancellor Henri François d'Aguesseau.

He was appointed to the position of docteur régent at the Faculté de médecine de Paris where he was for many years one of the eighteen royal censors for natural history, medicine and chemistry. At the beginning of the Seven Years' War in 1757, he joined the army of Westphalia. In the following years, he practised at the Hôpital de la Charité in Paris. Melchior Grimm wrote: "He joined a lot of knowledge and literature, a strong and pleasant spirit and all the qualities of a good man".

He wrote the article Docteur en médecine for the Encyclopédie by Denis Diderot and Jean le Rond d’Alembert.

References

Works (selection) 
1749: Découvertes philosophiques de Newton de Maclaurin. (translated from English)
1750: Nоuvelles Observations Microscopiques de Needham (translated from English)
1757: Observations sur une Hydrophobie spontanée, suivie de la rage.

Bibliography 
 Ferdinand Hoefer: Nouvelle Biographie générale. t. 22 Firmin-Didot, Paris (1862) (p. 1019).

External links 
 Louis-Anne La Virotte on Wikisource
 Journal des sçavans pour l'année 1759

18th-century French physicians
French translators
English–French translators
Contributors to the Encyclopédie (1751–1772)
1725 births
1759 deaths
18th-century French translators